Celos aun del aire matan ("Jealousy, even groundless, kills") is a 1660 opera in three acts - originally performed over three days - by Juan Hidalgo de Polanco to a libretto by Pedro Calderón de la Barca.

Performances and recordings
Television recording - Teatro Real, Jean-Claude Malgoire 2000
Excerpts - Resonanzen 2001, Jordi Savall

References

1660 operas